The earliest scientifically useful photograph of a total solar eclipse was made by Julius Berkowski at the Royal Observatory in Königsberg, Prussia, on July 28, 1851.  This was the first occasion that an accurate photographic image of a solar eclipse was recorded.

Background
A solar eclipse occurs when the Moon passes between the Earth and the Sun, casting a shadow on Earth that temporarily obscures part or all of the Sun's disc.  Eclipses can occur only when all three bodies are properly aligned.  Partial eclipses, in which only a portion of the Sun's surface is obscured, are relatively common due to the width of the Moon's outer shadow, or penumbra, which may be several hundred miles wide.  Total eclipses occur when the Moon's inner shadow, or umbra, reaches the surface of the Earth, completely obscuring the Sun over a much narrower portion of the ground. If the Moon is too far away at the time of an eclipse, its umbra may not reach the Earth's surface, and only a partial eclipse will be visible.

Before the advent of modern science, solar eclipses were often viewed with superstitious dread.  However, eclipses are also of interest to science due to the various phenomena that can be observed when they occur.  The sun's outer atmosphere, or corona, is normally invisible due to the brightness of the solar disc, but becomes visible from Earth during a total eclipse.  Until the twentieth century, solar eclipses provided the only opportunity for scientists to observe and study the Sun's corona.  With the development of photography during the first half of the nineteenth century, it became theoretically possible to record a still image of the Sun during a total eclipse.  A variety of processes were used for early photographs, of which the most successful was the Daguerreotype.

Monday, July 28, 1851

Photographing a rare event such as a total eclipse posed unique challenges for early photography, including the extreme contrast between the corona and the dark shadow of the Moon, as well as the unusual angle to which photographic equipment had to be oriented.  Prior to the eclipse of July 28, 1851, no properly exposed photograph of the solar corona had yet been produced.  For this occasion, the Royal Prussian Observatory at Königsberg (now Kaliningrad, Russia) commissioned one of the city's most skilled daguerreotypists, Johann Julius Friedrich Berkowski, to record a still image of the event.  The observers attached a small six-centimeter refracting telescope to a 15.8 centimeter Fraunhofer heliometer, and Berkowski made an eighty-four second exposure shortly after the beginning of totality.

Among the other observers were British astronomers Robert Grant and William Swan, and Austrian astronomer Karl Ludwig von Littrow. They deduced that prominences were part of the Sun, because the Moon was seen to cover and uncover them as it moved in front of the Sun.

Related eclipses
The eclipse of July 28, 1851 was part of Saros Series 143, a sequence of seventy-two partial and total solar eclipses occurring between 1617 and 2897.  The only total eclipses in this cycle occurred between 1797 and 1995.

References

External links 

 NASA chart graphics
 Googlemap
 NASA Besselian elements
 
 FIRST SUN PHOTO
 On the Berkowski Daguerreotype (Konigsberg, 1851 July 28): The First Correctly Exposed Eclipse Photograph of the Solar Corona
 From eclipse drawings to the coronagraph and spectroscopy
 History of Astrophotography Timeline
 Sketch of Solar Corona 1851 July 28
 Solar eclipse of July 28, 1851 in Russia 

1851 7 28
1851 in the environment
1851 in science
1851 7 28
July 1851 events